Germany was represented by Nora Nova, with the song "Man gewöhnt sich so schnell an das Schöne", at the 1964 Eurovision Song Contest, which took place on 21 March in Copenhagen. "Man gewöhnt sich so schnell an das Schöne" was the winner of the German national final, held on 27 February.

"Man gewöhnt sich so schnell an das Schöne" held the joint record for the longest ever song title in a Eurovision final alongside C'est le dernier qui a parlé qui a raison which represented France in 1991 until both were succeeded by The Social Network Song (Oh Oh - Uh - Oh Oh) which represented San Marino in 2012.

Before Eurovision

Ein Lied für Kopenhagen
The final was held at the TV studios in Frankfurt, hosted by Hilde Nocker. Six songs took part, with the winner chosen by an "expert" jury and a public jury. Only the scores and placements of the top three songs are currently known.

At Eurovision 
On the night of the final Nova performed 9th in the running order, following the United Kingdom and preceding Monaco. Only an audio recording of Nova's performance survives, as the video master of the 1964 contest is believed to have been lost in a fire at the Danish TV archive during the 1970s, and no other broadcaster had kept a copy. Voting was by each national jury awarding 5-3-1 to their top 3 songs, and at the close "Man gewöhnt sich so schnell an das Schöne" was one of four songs (along with the entries from Portugal, Switzerland and Yugoslavia) which had failed to pick up a single point. This was the third consecutive contest in which four countries had failed to score, and a first nul-points for Germany. The German jury awarded its 5 points to Luxembourg.

Voting 
Germany did not receive any points at the 1964 Eurovision Song Contest.

References 

1964
Countries in the Eurovision Song Contest 1964
Eurovision